Darren Legh West (born 19 April 1965) was elected to the Western Australian Legislative Council as a Labor Party member for Agricultural region at the 2013 state election. He took his seat on 22 May 2013.

Prior to his election, West was the chairman of the Wheatbelt Development Commission and a farmer at Jennacubbine.

References

1965 births
Living people
Members of the Western Australian Legislative Council
Place of birth missing (living people)
Australian Labor Party members of the Parliament of Western Australia
21st-century Australian politicians